Lenore Skenazy is an American speaker, blogger, syndicated columnist, author, and reality show host, known for her activism in favor of free-range parenting. In 2008, she wrote a controversial column on her decision to let her then-9-year-old son take the New York City Subway home alone, which became a national story and prompted massive media attention, and dubbing as "America's Worst Mom." In response, Skenazy wrote the book "Free-Range Kids" and ran a blog of the same name. She is the president of Let Grow, co-founded in 2018 with Daniel Shuchman, Dr. Peter Gray and Prof. Jonathan Haidt, an organisation advocating free-range parenting.

Career 
Skenazy is a 1981 graduate of Yale University. She got her master's degree from Columbia in 1983.

Skenazy spent fourteen years as a columnist for the New York Daily News, but was fired in December 2006. At the Daily News, she was tasked with writing about “intriguing oddballs”, with examples including a couple that got married underwater. She was featured in the 2006 Bravo series Tabloid Wars, which focused on journalists working at the Daily News.  She subsequently moved to The New York Sun and wrote there until it shut down in 2008.

Skenazy's 2008 column in The New York Sun, "Why I Let My 9-Year-Old Ride the Subway Alone," described her making the controversial decision to let her son take the New York City Subway home alone, which was completed without incident. The piece resulted in a flood of reactions ranging from accusations of child abuse to fond memories of first-time subway trips and childhood freedom.  The story was covered on The Today Show, Fox News, NPR, and MSNBC two days after the column appeared, later becoming worldwide news and being featured on Penn & Teller: Bullshit!, The View, Nightline, Good Morning America, CBS News, NBC Nightly News, Anderson Cooper, Dr. Phil, Nancy Grace, The BBC, the CBC, and ABC in Australia. In 2015, she was profiled in The New Yorker and The New York Times. The popularity of Skenazy's blog led to the creation of the book, Free-Range Kids, published in 2009 by John Wiley & Sons.

On the blog, Skenazy proposed May 22, 2010, as the first "Take Our Children to the Park & Leave Them There Day"—a day for children to learn how to play by themselves without constant supervision. In 2012 Skenazy hosted the reality television show World's Worst Mom on Discovery Life. The 13-episode series features Skenazy visiting extremely anxious parents, including the mother of a 10-year-old who still spoon-fed him, the mother of an 8-year-old who bought him a skateboard but only let him "ride" it on the grass, and the mother of a 13-year-old who still took him into the ladies' room.

Skenazy is the founder of the non-profit Let Grow, an organisation which advocates free-range parenting and childhood independence. The organisation reaches out schools in order to organise activities to encourage children to act independently.

In 2018, Utah became the first state in the U.S. to pass the Free-Range Parenting bill, assuring parents that they can give their children some independence without this being mistaken for neglect, which the Washington Post credited Skenazy's 2008 column as having a contributing influence.

Personal life 
Skenazy is Jewish. Her paternal grandparents emigrated from Çanakkale, Turkey.

Bibliography

 
 Who’s the Blonde that Married What’s-His-Name: The Ultimate Tip of the Tongue Test of Everything You Know You Know…But Can’t Remember Right Now (Penguin Books, June 2009)
 "The Dysfunctional Family Christmas Songbook" (Broadway Books, 2004), with co-author John Boswell.

Why Parents are More Paranoid than Ever, NY Post, March 31, 2018

References

External links

 Lenore Skenazy Website & Blog
 Lenore Skenazy archive, New York Sun
Lenore Skenazy - Reason.com

Year of birth missing (living people)
Living people
American women columnists
New York Daily News people
The New York Sun people
Yale University alumni
20th-century American journalists
20th-century American women writers
21st-century American journalists
21st-century American women writers
American people of Sephardic-Jewish descent
Jewish American writers